The EHF coefficient rank is a list made by European Handball Federation. The list is a result of the clubs of the EHF member federations' results in the EHF Champions League (CL), EHF European League (EL), EHF Cup Winners' Cup (CWC) and EHF European Cup (EC) the past three seasons. Most national federations have five (four from 2012–13) teams in the above-mentioned competitions. There are, however, differences between which competitions they qualify for and in which round they enter. If a national federation has more than one team in the same competition, they may enter the same competition in different rounds. For example, the national federations that have two teams in the women's Champions League: The national champions qualify directly for the group stage, while the runners-up start in the qualification round.

On 27 September 2022, the EHF Executive Committee announced new changes in the official coefficient ranking system at a meeting in Luxembourg. The new system includes separate rankings for the EHF Champions League and the EHF European League, in which a three-part rankings system will reflects the performance of each federation in the respective competition more properly.

League Coefficient in the 2021/22 season for Men 

As of 2021–22 season

Historical rankings

League Coefficient in the 2023/24 season for Women

Women's EHF Champions League 
As of 2023–24 season.

Historical rankings 2007-2023

History

2018/19 
Below is the top 10 for 2018/19.

2017/18 
Below is the top 10 for 2017/18.

2016/17 
Below is the top 10 for 2016/17.

2015/16 
Below is the top 10 for 2015/16.

2014/15 
Below is the top 10 for 2014/15.

2013/14 
Below is the top 10 for 2013/14. For men the EC is EHF European Cup, while it for women is EHF Cup.

2012/13 
Below is the top 10 for 2012/13. For men the EC is EHF European Cup, while it for women is EHF Cup.

2011/12 
Below is the top 10 for 2011/12.

2010/11 
Below is the top 10 for 2010/11.

2009/10 
Below is the top 10 for 2009/10.

2008/09 
Below is the top 10 for 2008/09.

References

External links  
 Champions League seedning, men, 2011/12
 Champions League seedning, women, 2011/12

European Handball Federation